The Central Office for Jewish Emigration in Prague, reformed in 1942 as the , was part of the Central Office for Jewish Emigration.

References

Sources

External links
Related documents (and post-1942) at European Holocaust Research Infrastructure

The Holocaust in Bohemia and Moravia